Li Boyong (born May 1932) is a Chinese politician who served as  from 1993 to 1998.

He was a member of the 14th Central Committee of the Chinese Communist Party. He was a member of the Standing Committee of the 9th National People's Congress.

Biography
Li was born in Harbin, Heilongjiang, Manchukuo, in May 1932, while his ancestral home in Tianjin. In 1948, he enrolled at Harbin Institute of Technology and before long he became an interpreter in the People's Liberation Army Air Force. He joined the Chinese Communist Party (CCP) in February 1957. In 1958, he went on to the Zhukovsky Air Force Engineering Academy, where he majored in airplane engine. After graduation, he was despatched to the 3rd Design Department of the 1st Branch of the 5th Academy of the Ministry of National Defense and was reassigned to the 7th Ministry of Machinery Industry in 1973. In 1984, he was appointed president of the China Academy of Launch Vehicle Technology, in addition to serving as chief engineer of the Ministry of Aerospace Industry. During his term in office, hr presided over the development of the Long March rockets engines. In 1986, he became , rising to minister in 1993. He also served as deputy party secretary and vice governor of Sichuan from 1990 to 1993. In March 1998, he took office as vice chairperson of the National People's Congress Law Committee.

References

1932 births
Living people
People from Harbin
Harbin Institute of Technology alumni
People's Republic of China politicians from Heilongjiang
Chinese Communist Party politicians from Heilongjiang
Members of the 14th Central Committee of the Chinese Communist Party
Members of the Standing Committee of the 9th National People's Congress